Jakkepalli is a village in Kusumanchi mandal, Khammam district, Telangana, India. It is located 10 km from Kusumanchi, and near the border of Nalgonda district.

Famous people who were born in this village include Chandala Keshavadasu (1876–1956), the first lyricist in the history of the Telugu Film Industry.

References

Villages in Khammam district